Damačava (Domachevo) is a town in Belarus (Brest District, part of Brest Region).

History
Within the Grand Duchy of Lithuania, Damačava was part of Brest Litovsk Voivodeship. In 1795, Damačava was acquired by the Russian Empire as a result of the Third Partition of Poland.

From 1921 until 1939, Damačava (Domaczewo) was part of the Second Polish Republic. In September 1939, Damačava was occupied by the Red Army and, on 14 November 1939, incorporated into the Byelorussian SSR.

From 21 June 1941 until 23 July 1944, Damačava was occupied by Nazi Germany and administered as a part of the Generalbezirk Wolhynien-Podolien of Reichskommissariat Ukraine.

The majority of the town inhabitants were Jewish before World War II. From November 1941, the Jews were kept imprisoned in a ghetto. In September 1942 they were murdered in a mass execution.

Notable residents
Anthony Sawoniuk was a resident of Damačava who fled after murdering Jews during the Holocaust. Later working as a ticket collector in Britain, he was sentenced to life imprisonment for the murder of 18 Jews in the United Kingdom's only war crimes trial.

References

External links
 

Urban-type settlements in Belarus
Populated places in Brest Region
Brest Litovsk Voivodeship
Brestsky Uyezd
Polesie Voivodeship
Shtetls
Holocaust locations in Poland
Brest District
Jewish communities destroyed in the Holocaust